KF2, is a kart racing class for top drivers aged 14 and up.

This class used to be called Intercontinental A (ICA) and has changed since January 2007 when CIK-FIA decided to replace the 100 cc water-cooled two-stroke engines with 125 cc Touch-and-Go (TaG) water-cooled two-stroke engines (KF type). The engines produce . The KF2 class karts use hand-operated front brakes via a lever. The chassis  must be approved by the CIK-FIA. Minimum weight with driver is 160 kg for national and 158 kg for international events.

Karts are equipped with an electric starter and a centrifugal clutch. The engine rpm is limited at 15,000 rpm. It is one of the highest kart classes and is run in both national and continental championships, with the most prestigious being the European Championship and the World Cup.

In 2010, karts of the KF2 category were mandated in the Karting World Championship.

In 2016, the class was renamed OK, standing for the new Original Kart class. The new karts had much of the electronics removed, and had to push-started.

See also
 KF1, the top level of karting
 KF3, a KF1 and KF2 feeder series
 KZ1, the fastest KZ karting racing category
 KZ2, the second fastest KZ karting racing category
 Superkart, road racing with kart sized open-wheel cars

References

External links
 CIK-FIA website
 Karting 1 – Karting Information. Tips, Guides, Interviews, and Karting Features

Kart racing series